The Flor do Prado River is a river in the state of Mato Grosso in Brazil, a right tributary of the Roosevelt River.

The  Rio Flor do Prado Ecological Station, a fully protected environmental unit created in 2003, lies on the right bank of the river.

See also
List of rivers of Mato Grosso

References

Rivers of Mato Grosso